Mark Summers (born 4 August 1966) is a former Australian rules footballer who played for Richmond in the Victorian Football League (VFL) during the late 1980s.

Summers played his early football at Old Xaverians with a strong presence before joining Richmond. He was used mostly as a ruckman and centre half forward in the VFL and after just three appearances in 1988 was a regular for the second half of the 1989 season. He only twice played in a winning team at Richmond after being struck down with a knee injury in game, forcing Summers to retire.

He competed in the 1988 Adelaide Bicentennial Carnival with the Australian Amateurs side.

Summers is now a musculoskeletal physiotherapist and has three children, Madeleine, Claudia and Harrison.

References

Holmesby, Russell and Main, Jim (2007). The Encyclopedia of AFL Footballers. 7th ed. Melbourne: Bas Publishing.

1966 births
Living people
Richmond Football Club players
Old Xaverians Football Club players
Australian rules footballers from Victoria (Australia)
Place of birth missing (living people)